The Battle of Thermopylae in 480 BCE was a last stand by a Greek army led by King Leonidas I of Sparta against an Achaemenid Persian army led by Xerxes I during the Second Persian invasion of Greece. There is a long tradition of upholding the story of the battle as an example of virtuous self-sacrifice.

Antiquity 
The battle's earliest known appearance in culture is a series of epigrams commemorating the dead written by Simonides of Ceos in the battle's aftermath. Already by the fourth century BCE, the battle had been reframed as a victory of sorts in Greek writing, in contrast to how it was described by fifth-century BCE Greek historian Herodotus.

18th century 
In Europe, interest in the battle was revitalized in the 1700s with the publication of the poems Leonidas, A Poem by Richard Glover in 1737 and Leonidas by Willem van Haren in 1742. Glover's poem uses the story to exemplify the proper virtues of a good monarch.

19th century 
Jacques-Louis David painted Leonidas at Thermopylae during the reign of Napoleon and eventually finished the painting in 1814, depicting Leonidas and the soldiers in the moments leading up to the battle as a positive example of patriotism.

German poet Theodor Körner referenced Thermopylae to inspire his fellow countrymen to fight against Napoleon in the 1812 poem Auf dem Schlachtfelde von Aspern. Thermopylae was often invoked as an example to be emulated in the lead-up to the Greek War of Independence against the Ottoman Empire, for example in the 1798 hymn  by Rigas Feraios. In the United States, the Battle of the Alamo in 1836 during the Texas Revolution was compared to Thermopylae only weeks after its conclusion, and a battle memorial erected in Austin, Texas in 1843 references Thermopylae.

20th century 
The 1962 film The 300 Spartans depicts the battle and the broader conflict as a parallel of the then-ongoing Cold War, with Greeks and Persians representing NATO and the Soviet Bloc respectively, and Sparta representing the US. The 1998 novel Gates of Fire by Steven Pressfield is unusual in depicting the battle as gruesome rather than glorious.

See also
300 (comics)
300 (film)

References

Further reading 

 
 
 
 
 
 
 

Culture
Places in popular culture
Ancient Greece in art and culture
Thermopylae